Mohamed El Yamani (born January 1, 1982) is an Egyptian footballer. He plays as a striker, currently for Maltese Premier Division side Floriana FC.

Club career

Standard Liège
At Standard Liège, El Yamani impressed, and his club thought they would cash in on him when he excelled at the FIFA World Youth Championship 2001 in Argentina. He was very close from Italian giants Juventus, but a dramatic car accident in Cairo set back this move. In July 2001, when El Yamani was on his way to the airport, he lost control of his car after bursting a tyre. In addition to this offer from Juventus, another one from Bayern Munich did not materialize.

In August 2002, El Yamani was listed for loan, and although Alemannia Aachen announced that it had acquired his services, he remained at Standard Liège. Eventually, KV Mechelen signed El Yamani on loan at the start of 2003.

Loan to KV Mechelen
Despite poor performances from his team, El Yamani, who wore number nine, was impressive.

Upon returning to Standard Liège at the start of 2003-2004 season, he had a superb pre-season, and featured heavily for his club in the following months.

Return to Egypt
In May 2004, El Yamani decided to return to Egypt, signing for giants Zamalek SC
.

Back to Europe

In January 2011 he was close to signing for Finnish club Kuopion Palloseura but instead decided to join Maltese club Floriana FC. He could help the Maltese team finish 2nd in the league and gain silverware for the first time in 17 years as the team was crowned Maltese Cup winners qualifying to UEFA Europa League.

International career
El Yamani has played two matches for Egypt's first team, scoring one goal.

International goals 
Egypt's score first.

National Youth team
El Yamani was a regular player in Egypt's Youth team who got the Bronze Medalist in FIFA World Youth Championship 2001, as Yamani scored 4 goals against Argentina,  U.S.A,  Netherlands and,  Paraguay. His goal against Paraguay was the most valuable among the four as it earned the Bronze Medal for Egypt.

Honours

National team
 Bronze Medalist at FIFA World Youth Championship 2001
 Silver Boot at FIFA World Youth Championship 2001

Standard
 Gold Medalist at Belgian Cup

Floriana FC
 Gold Medalist at Maltese Cup 2010-2011
 Silver Medalist at Maltese Premier League

References

External links
 
 Mohamed El Yamani (At Egyptian Football.net)

1982 births
Living people
Egyptian footballers
Egyptian expatriate footballers
Egypt international footballers
El Yamani
El Yamani
El Yamani
Expatriate footballers in Belgium
Egyptian Premier League players
Association football forwards
El Shams SC players